Marzhausen is an Ortsgemeinde – a community belonging to a Verbandsgemeinde – in the Westerwaldkreis in Rhineland-Palatinate, Germany. The community, first documented in 1346, lies between Hachenburg and Altenkirchen on the edge of the Kroppach Switzerland (Kroppacher Schweiz) and is characterized by agriculture. Marzhausen belongs to the Verbandsgemeinde of Hachenburg, a kind of collective municipality, governed by a community council of 7 council members, including the extraofficial mayor (Bürgermeister), who are elected.

Marzhausen is linked to the long-distance highway network through Bundesstraße 414. The Autobahn interchanges Mogendorf and Dierdorf on the A 3 (Cologne–Frankfurt) can me reached over Bundesstraßen 8 and 413.

References

External links
Marzhausen in the collective municipality’s Web pages 

Municipalities in Rhineland-Palatinate
Westerwaldkreis